Carel Godfried Withuys (2 May 1794, Amsterdam - 14 February 1865, The Hague) was a Dutch writer and poet. Much of his work was patriotic in nature, especially during and after the Belgian Revolution of 1830.

Bibliography
De slag bij Quatre Bras (1815) 
Drietal krijgsliederen (1830) 
Aan Holland (1831) 
Het bombardement van Antwerpen (1831)
Hollands vlag (1831)
Gedichten (1833) 
Bekroonde volksliederen, uitgegeven door de Maatschappij tot Nut van 't Algemeen (1835) 
Cantate, ter gelegenheid der viering van het vijftigjarig bestaan van het Amsterdamsche eerste departement der Maatschappij tot Nut van 't Algemeen (1835) 
Gedenkboek van 1830-1831 (1856) 
Verhalen, romancen en vertellingen (1863)

References

 Jaarboek van de Maatschappij der Nederlandse Letterkunde, 1865 (1865)
 A. J. van der Aa, Biographisch woordenboek der Nederlanden. Deel 20 (1877) 
 F. Jos. van den Branden and J.G. Frederiks, Biographisch woordenboek der Noord- en Zuidnederlandsche letterkunde (1888-1891)
 K. ter Laan, Letterkundig woordenboek voor Noord en Zuid (1952)
 G. J. van Bork and P. J. Verkruijsse, De Nederlandse en Vlaamse auteurs (1985) 

1794 births
1865 deaths
19th-century Dutch poets
Writers from Amsterdam
Dutch male poets